Louis Joseph Watteau (10 April 1731 - 17 August 1798), known as the Watteau of Lille (a title also given to his son) was a French painter active in Lille.

Watteau was born in Valenciennes. His father Noël Joseph Watteau (1689-1756) was brother to Jean-Antoine Watteau, the painter of fêtes galantes, and he was himself father to the painter François Watteau.

He played a decisive role in the foundation of what would become the Musée lillois des Beaux-Arts, opened in 1803, by producing the first ever inventory of paintings confiscated by the state during the French Revolution.

He died in Lille, aged 67.

Works 
 La Jolie colombe, oil on wood, Musée des Beaux-Arts, Valenciennes
 La 14ème expérience aérostatique de M. Blanchard, oil on canvas, Musée de l'Hospice Comtesse, Lille
 Le Bombardement de Lille, oil on canvas, Musée de l'Hospice Comtesse, Lille
 Le retour des Aéronautes Blanchard et Lépinard, oil on canvas, Musée de l'Hospice Comtesse, Lille

Bibliography 
 Mabille de Poncheville.
 Claude-Gérard Marcus.
 Gaëtane Maës, Les Watteau de Lille, Paris, 1998.

External links 
 Louis Joseph Watteau on Artcyclopedia

1731 births
1798 deaths
People from Valenciennes
18th-century French painters
French male painters
Artists from Lille
18th-century French male artists